Thornley-with-Wheatley is a civil parish in Ribble Valley, Lancashire, England.  It contains nine  listed buildings that are recorded in the National Heritage List for England.  All of the listed buildings are designated at Grade II, the lowest of the three grades, which is applied to "buildings of national importance and special interest".  The parish is entirely rural, and most of the listed buildings are farmhouses and farm buildings.  The other listed buildings are a house, a church and presbytery, and a mounting block.

Buildings

References

Citations

Sources

Lists of listed buildings in Lancashire
Buildings and structures in Ribble Valley